Harrah's Cherokee Valley River is a casino and hotel on the Qualla Boundary in Murphy, North Carolina. It is owned by the Eastern Band of Cherokee Indians (EBCI) and operated by Caesars Entertainment.

History
Proposed in 2014 and at a cost of $110 million, Harrah's Cherokee Valley River opened on September 28, 2015; designed by Cuningham Group Architecture Inc., the facility included a gaming floor, hotel and food court. In 2018, a $13 million expansion added a  entertainment area that includes bowling, arcade games and a full-service restaurant. In March 2021 sports betting was added.

On July 8, 2021, the EBCI approved a $275 million expansion that will include an additional hotel tower, a new restaurant, a hotel lobby café, a spa and indoor pool, and additional gaming space; JCJ Architecture was designated to design the expansion.

Features and design

Architecture
The hotel is seven-story tall and has 300 rooms.

Games
The casino has  of gaming space, where it has over one thousand video poker and gaming machines; traditional table games including blackjack, roulette, baccarat, and craps; and a sportsbook.

Amenities
The casino has one full-service restaurant, The Landing Café, and a food court that includes the Earl of Sandwich, co-branded Nathan's Famous/Arthur Treacher's, Moe's Southwest Grill, Panda Express, and Starbucks.

See also
Gambling in North Carolina
Caesars Southern Indiana
Harrah's Cherokee

References

External links

EBCI Holdings
Native American casinos
Casinos in North Carolina
Buildings and structures in Cherokee County, North Carolina
Tourist attractions in Cherokee County, North Carolina
Hotels established in 2015
Hotels in North Carolina
Casino hotels
Harrah's Entertainment
Native American history of North Carolina